Gianluca Curci (born 12 July 1985) is an Italian professional footballer who plays as a goalkeeper, most recently for Hammarby IF in the Swedish Allsvenskan.

Curci has previously played for Roma, Siena, Sampdoria, Bologna, 1. FSV Mainz 05 and AFC Eskilstuna.

Club career

Roma
Born in Rome, Curci is a product of the A.S. Roma youth academy. At only 19, he became the club's first choice goalkeeper for the second half of the 2004–05 season after injuries to fellow goalkeepers Ivan Pelizzoli and Carlo Zotti. He was replaced in the 2005–06 season by new Brazilian keeper Doni. Curci signed a new four-year contract on 16 July 2007.

Siena
On 25 June 2008, Siena confirmed they signed Curci in a co-ownership deal from Roma for €1.75 million and signed the remaining 50% rights of Daniele Galloppa for another €1.75M. In exchange, Roma signed keeper Artur for €750,000 and defender Simone Loria for €2.8M.

Curci impressed in all his matches, notably his last two Serie A matches, helping Siena overcome Roma 1–0, and preventing Genoa from scoring more than they did. Curci then impressed in the Tuscan Derby against Fiorentina, performing 3 incredible reaction saves to help Siena win 1–0.

Sampdoria
On 1 July 2010, Sampdoria bought Siena's half for €2.25 million. Roma retained their half. Curci played for Sampdoria in a match for qualification to the Champions League, against Werder Bremen, but his team lost. Curci was a key player for Sampdoria during the 2010–11 season and he made some crucial saves for the club. He was an ever-present and the club's undisputed first choice goalkeeper.

Roma return
On 24 June 2011, Roma bought back Curci and Stefano Guberti from Sampdoria for a nominal fee of €1,000 on two-year (Guberti) and three-year deals (Curci) respectively. On 22 April 2012, Curci made a substitute appearance in a Serie A match against Juventus after
Roma's starting goalkeeper Maarten Stekelenburg received a red card.

Bologna
On 16 July 2012, Curci was signed by Bologna in a temporary deal with an option to purchase for €1 million. On 8 July 2013, the loan was extended for another season, with an option to purchase for €1.2 million. Curci also extended his contract with Roma to last until 30 June 2015.

Roma return
On 2 September 2014, Curci was included in Roma's squad for the 2014–15 UEFA Champions League as one of the four club trained players required under UEFA rules.

Mainz 05
On 15 August 2015, Curci was signed by Bundesliga side Mainz on a two-year contract as a free agent. In January 2017, Curci had an unsuccessful trial with Bristol Rovers.

He left the club on 30 January 2017, after failing to make a single league appearance.

AFC Eskilstuna
On 18 January 2018, Curci signed a two-year deal with Swedish Superettan side AFC Eskilstuna. He kept 18 clean sheets in 27 league appearances, a new club record, as Eskilstuna won a promotion to Allsvenskan through qualifiers.

Curci terminated his contract with AFC by mutual consent on 21 January 2019, with the club citing "personal reasons" for his departure. However, according to Curci himself, he sought to leave Eskilstuna due to differences with the club's management.

Hammarby IF
On 24 January 2019, Curci signed a six-month contract with fellow Swedish club Hammarby IF, replacing the injured starting goalkeeper Johan Wiland, with an extension option of a further one-and-a-half year. Curci confirmed his departure from the club on 8 July 2019 as his contract had expired.

International career
Curci has represented Italy multiple times at youth level. He received his first call-up to the Azzurri squad for a friendly against Hungary.

He has not been called up since November 2008.

Career statistics

Honours

Club
Roma
 Coppa Italia: 2006–07, 2007–08
 Supercoppa Italiana: 2007

References

External links
FIGC 

1985 births
Footballers from Rome
Living people
Association football goalkeepers
Italian footballers
A.S. Roma players
A.C.N. Siena 1904 players
U.C. Sampdoria players
Bologna F.C. 1909 players
1. FSV Mainz 05 players
AFC Eskilstuna players
Hammarby Fotboll players
Serie A players
Allsvenskan players
Superettan players
Italy under-21 international footballers
Italy youth international footballers
Italian expatriate footballers
Expatriate footballers in Germany
Italian expatriate sportspeople in Germany
Expatriate footballers in Sweden
Italian expatriate sportspeople in Sweden